William Hoyet "Whitey" Bell (born September 13, 1932) is a retired American basketball player.

He played collegiately for the North Carolina State University.  Bell averaged 14.2 points per game as a senior for NC State during the 1957–58 season.

He played for the New York Knicks (1959–61) in the NBA for 36 games.  Bell then played with the San Francisco Saints (1961–62) of the American Basketball League and briefly in 1962 with the Pittsburgh Rens of the ABL.  On November 1, 1961, Bell scored 30 points in a game against the Kansas City Steers.

External links

1932 births
Living people
Basketball players from Kentucky
NC State Wolfpack men's basketball players
New York Knicks players
People from Monticello, Kentucky
Pittsburgh Rens players
San Francisco Saints players
Undrafted National Basketball Association players
American men's basketball players
Guards (basketball)